Festuca actae is a species of grass which can be found in New Zealand.

Description

General description
The leaf-sheaths auricle is identical in size to the membrane but is erect.

Spikelets and palea
Spikelets are solitary, and carry both scaberulous pedicelles and 4-7 (sometimes 12) fertile florets.

Glumes and lemma
The glumes are membranous and keelless with scabrous veins. Lemma itself have scaberulous surface and muticous with dentated apex.

Flowers and fruits
Their ovary is hairy at the apex.

References

actae
Flora of Australia
Flora of New Zealand